Paloich Airport, Heliport (also Palogue, Palouge Paloug, Paluge) is the airport in Upper Nile State  in South Sudan which provides transport operations for the adjacent Palogue oil field and the settlement Paloich.

Passengers

Airlines and destinations

Passenger

See also 
 List of airports in South Sudan

References 

Airports in South Sudan